Russ Walker may refer to:

Russ Walker (rugby league) (born 1962), rugby League player
Russ Walker (ice hockey) (born 1953), ice hockey right winger

See also
Russell Walker (1842–1922), cricketer